Discophora necho, the blue duffer, is a species of butterfly in the duffers group, that is, the Morphinae subfamily of the brush-footed butterflies family.

References 

Amathusiini
Butterflies of Asia